Morenelaphus is an extinct genus of deer that lived in South America during the Late Pleistocene. Fossils of the genus have been recovered from the Agua Blanca, Fortín Tres Pozos and Luján Formations of Argentina, the Ñuapua Formation of Bolivia, Santa Vitória do Palmar in southern Brazil, Paraguay and the Sopas Formation of Uruguay.

Tooth enamel microwear analysis suggests Morenelaphus had a mixed-feeder diet, including grass and perhaps with the occasional ingestion of gritstone. It is believed that this genus went extinct during the Pleistocene-Holocene transition due to climate change and a nutritional crisis.

Reexamination of Brazilian remains has revealed a higher degree of species diversity than previously ascertained. This study also notes that Morenelaphus were rather large sized cervids.

References 

Capreolinae
Prehistoric deer
Pleistocene even-toed ungulates
Pleistocene mammals of South America
Lujanian
Pleistocene Argentina
Fossils of Argentina
Pleistocene Bolivia
Fossils of Bolivia
Pleistocene Brazil
Fossils of Brazil
Pleistocene Paraguay
Fossils of Paraguay
Pleistocene Uruguay
Fossils of Uruguay
Fossil taxa described in 1922
Prehistoric even-toed ungulate genera